Jus soli, commonly referred to as birthright citizenship, is the right of anyone born in the territory of a state to nationality or citizenship.

Jus soli was part of the English common law, in contrast to jus sanguinis, which derives from the Roman law that influenced the civil-law systems of mainland Europe.

Jus soli is the predominant rule in the Americas; explanations for this geographical phenomenon include: the establishment of lenient laws by past European colonial powers to entice immigrants from the Old World and displace native populations in the New World, along with the emergence of successful Latin American independence movements that widened the definition and granting of citizenship, as a prerequisite to the abolishment of slavery since the 19th century. 
Outside the Americas, however, jus soli is rare. Since the Twenty-seventh Amendment of the Constitution of Ireland was enacted in 2004, no European country grants citizenship based on unconditional or near-unconditional jus soli.

Almost all states in Europe, Asia, Africa and Oceania grant citizenship at birth based upon the principle of jus sanguinis ("right of blood"), in which citizenship is inherited through parents rather than birthplace, or a restricted version of jus soli in which citizenship by birthplace is automatic only for the children of certain immigrants.

Jus soli in many cases helps prevent statelessness. Countries that have acceded to the 1961 Convention on the Reduction of Statelessness are obligated to grant nationality to people born in their territory who would otherwise become stateless persons. The American Convention on Human Rights similarly provides that "Every person has the right to the nationality of the state in whose territory he was born if he does not have the right to any other nationality."

National laws 
Lex soli is a law used in practice to regulate who can assert the right of jus soli and under what circumstances they can do so. Most states provide a specific lex soli—in application of the respective jus soli—and it is the most common means of acquiring nationality. However, a frequent exception to lex soli is imposed when a child is born to a parent in the diplomatic or consular service of another state on a mission to the state in question.

Unrestricted jus soli

Africa 
  Chad (the choice to take Chadian citizenship, or that of the parents is made at 18 years of age)
 
 : Per the Tanzania Citizenship Act of 1995, "any child born within the borders of the United Republic of Tanzania, on or after Union Day, 26 April 1964, is granted citizenship of Tanzania, except for children of foreign diplomats." While Tanzania technically observes birthright citizenship, it is official practice that birth in Tanzania has to be further supported by descent from a Tanzanian parent to be recognized as a citizen by birth. This practice has gone uncontested in courts of law. Also, dual citizenship is not allowed after turning 18 years old. At 18 years old, Tanzanian citizenship will cease unless other citizenships are renounced.

North America 
 : Guaranteed by the Constitution. 
  Barbados: Guaranteed by the Constitution.
 
 : Subsection 3(2) of the Citizenship Act states that Canadian citizenship by birth in Canada – including Canadian airspace and territorial waters – is granted to a child born in Canada even if neither parent was a Canadian citizen or permanent resident except if either parent was a diplomat, in service to a diplomat, or employed by an international agency of equal status to a diplomat. However, if neither parent was a diplomat, the nationality or immigration status of the parents do not matter. Some Conservative Party members wish to end birthright citizenship in Canada to the children of tourists and unauthorized immigrants.
 : Jus soli requires registration with the Costa Rican government before the age of twenty-five.
  Cuba
 
 
 
 
 
 
  Mexico: Article 30 of the Constitution of Mexico states that persons born in Mexican territory are natural-born citizens of Mexico regardless of their parents' nationality. The definition of "territory" includes vessels/aircraft flagged to Mexico travelling in international waters or airspace.
 
 
 
 
 
 
  United States: The Citizenship Clause of the 14th Amendment to the United States Constitution, ratified in 1868, provides: "All persons born or naturalized in the United States, and subject to the jurisdiction thereof, are citizens of the United States and of the State wherein they reside." The concept of birthright citizenship applying to the child born of a foreign national in the country without proper credentials has never been formally litigated, but the U.S. Supreme Court's decision in United States v. Wong Kim Ark (1898) allowed the government to deny citizenship to U.S.-born children only in the cases of children born to foreign diplomats and children born to enemy forces engaged in hostile occupation of the country's territory, and thus this decision is most often interpreted as barring the government from denying citizenship to those born in the U.S. based on the alienage of their parents. (see United States nationality law).

 The U.S. Constitution's natural-born-citizen clause, which determines the eligibility of those running for the office of President, has been at the center of a number of controversies and subject to various interpretations. Some of these interpretations entail a strict jus soli, barring anyone who was not born on U.S soil from attaining the presidency, while others are more permissive.

 From 24 January 2020, the Trump administration adopted a new policy to make it more difficult for foreign nationals to obtain a nonimmigrant visa to travel to the US to give birth on US soil to ensure their children become US citizens, a practice commonly known as "birth tourism." Conservatives in the United States have often called for legislative reforms, including an amendment to the Citizenship Clause of the 14th Amendment, to end jus soli in the United States – particularly for children born to persons unlawfully present in the country. However, this may be difficult to accomplish, as the general consensus among American lawyers and legal scholars, regardless of personal ideology, is that the 14th Amendment grants jus soli citizenship to any child born in the United States.

Persons born in American Samoa (a U.S. territory) are not U.S. citizens at birth (they are non-citizen U.S. nationals, unless one of their parents is a U.S. citizen). In 2019, a federal court ruled that American Samoans are U.S. citizens, but the ruling was put on hold, and the litigation is ongoing.

South America 
  Argentina
 
  Brazil (requires that the foreign parents are not working for their country's government in Brazil at the time the child is born).
  Chile's Constitution grants nationality to "those born in Chilean territory, with the exception of the children of foreigners who are in Chile in service of their government, and the children of transient foreigners, all of which, however, may opt for the Chilean nationality."
 
 
  Paraguay
  Peru (registration required at 18 years of age)
  Uruguay
  Venezuela

Oceania

Asia 

 Pakistan The primary law governing nationality regulations is the Pakistan Citizenship Act, 1951, which came into force on 13 April 1951. With few exceptions, almost all individuals born in the country are automatically citizens at birth.

Restricted jus soli 
There is a trend in some countries toward restricting jus soli by requiring that at least one of the child's parents be a citizen, national or legal permanent resident of the state in question at time of the child's birth. Modification of jus soli has been criticized as contributing to economic inequality, the perpetuation of unfree labour from a helot underclass and statelessness. Jus soli has been restricted in the following countries:

Africa 
 : According to Article 4 of the Nationality Law of the Arab Republic of Egypt, children born in Egypt gain citizenship at birth if their father or mother was also born in Egypt.
 : A person who was born in Morocco to parents also born in Morocco and whose immigration is legal, can register as a Moroccan two years prior to becoming adult.
 : A person born in Namibia to a Namibian citizen parent or a foreign parent who is ordinarily resident in Namibia, is a Namibian citizen at birth (see Namibian nationality law).
 : A person born in São Tomé and Príncipe acquires São Toméan nationality, as long as the parents are residents of the country. The only exception is if any of the parents have diplomatic immunity (see São Toméan nationality law).
 : Since 6 October 1995, a person born in South Africa to South African citizens or permanent residents is automatically granted South African citizenship (see South African nationality law).
 : A person born before 1994 gains Sudanese nationality at birth if his father was also born in Sudan. If his father was not born in Sudan, they can apply to the Minister to be granted Sudanese nationality.
 : Individuals born in Tunisia are citizens by birth if their father and grandfather were born in Tunisia. Additionally, the person must declare before becoming an adult (20 years) that they want to be a citizen.

North America 
 : The constitution was amended on 26 January 2010. The amendment broadened the definition of the 2004 migration law – which excluded from citizenship children born to individuals that were "in transit" – to include "non-residents" (including individuals with expired residency visas and undocumented workers).

South America 
 : Article 94 of the constitution grants Colombian nationality by birth provided that at least one of the parents is a Colombian national or a legal resident. By presidential decree, in August 2019 nationality was granted to children of Venezuelan migrants born in Colombia regardless of residential status of their parents.

Asia 
 : Children born to a foreign father with valid residency permits who himself was born in Bahrain have right to citizenship.
 : In 1996, Cambodia changed the law to grant citizenship to children born to foreign parents only if they are living legally in the Kingdom of Cambodia (under Article 4(2)(a) of the 1996 Nationality Law).
  Hong Kong: Since the July 1997 transfer of sovereignty over Hong Kong, most political rights and eligibility for most benefits are conferred to permanent residents regardless of citizenship. Conversely, PRC citizens who are not permanent residents (such as residents of Mainland China and Macao) are not conferred these rights and privileges. The Basic Law provides that all citizens of the People's Republic of China (PRC) born in the territory are permanent residents of the territory and have the right of abode in Hong Kong. The 2001 case Director of Immigration v. Chong Fung Yuen clarified that the parents need not have right of abode and as a consequence many women from Mainland China began coming to Hong Kong to give birth. By 2008, the number of babies in the territory born to Mainland China mothers had grown to twenty-five times the number five years prior. Furthermore, persons of Chinese ethnicity (wholly or partly) with PRC nationality born in Hong Kong are PRC nationals with Hong Kong permanent residence Non-PRC citizens born to non-PRC citizen Hong Kong permanent resident parents in Hong Kong also receive permanent residence of Hong Kong at birth. Other persons must have "ordinarily resided" in Hong Kong for seven continuous years in order to gain permanent residence (Articles 24(2) and 24(5)).
 : Article 976(4) of the Civil Code of Iran grants citizenship at birth to persons born in Iran of foreign parents if one or both of the parents were themselves born in Iran. See Iranian nationality law.
 : Children born in Israel who have never acquired another citizenship are eligible to apply for Israeli citizenship between their 18th and 21st birthday if they have lived in Israel for over 5 years (see Israeli citizenship law).
 : Children born in Japan to stateless or unknown parents are Japanese nationals at birth.
  Macau: Similar to Hong Kong, most political rights and eligibility for most benefits are conferred to permanent residents regardless of citizenship since the December 1999 transfer of sovereignty over Macau, according to the Basic Law of Macau. Becoming a Macau permanent resident has slightly different requirements depending on an individual's nationality. Acquisition by birth operates on a modified jus soli basis; individuals born in Macau to Chinese nationals or to Portuguese citizens domiciled there are automatically permanent residents, while those born to other foreign nationals must have at least one parent who possesses right of abode (see Right of abode in Macau).
 : A person born in Malaysia on or after 16 September 1963 with at least one parent being a Malaysian citizen or permanent resident is automatically a Malaysian citizen (see Malaysian nationality law).
 Mongolia: A person born in Mongolia to foreign parents with valid residency permits can apply for Mongolian nationality when they turn the age of 16. A child in Mongolian territory with unidentified parents can receive Mongolian citizenship (see Mongolian nationality law).
  Pakistan: Pakistan applies jus soli, however, the application was restricted by a Peshawar high court decision to non-refugees only.
 : Any child born to parents with Taiwanese citizenship, even those living abroad, can acquire Taiwanese nationality at birth. Children born in Taiwan to stateless parents or have unknown parentage are considered Taiwanese nationals at birth (see Taiwanese nationality law).
 : Thailand operated a system of pure jus soli prior to 1972. Due to illegal immigration from Burma, the Nationality Act was amended to require that both parents be legally resident and domiciled in Thailand for at least five years for their child to be granted Thai citizenship at birth. Furthermore, someone who has Thai citizenship by sole virtue of jus soli may be stripped of Thai citizenship under various conditions (such as living abroad), which does not apply to people who have Thai citizenship by virtue of jus sanguinis.

Europe 
 : Children born in France (including overseas territories) to at least one parent who is either (i) a French citizen or (ii) born in France, automatically acquire French citizenship at birth. Children born to foreign parents who do not fulfil either of these two conditions may acquire citizenship from age 13 subject to residence conditions (see French nationality law). A child born in France to foreign parents becomes a French citizen automatically upon turning 18, provided that they reside in France on their 18th birthday and have had their primary residence in France for a total (but not necessarily continuous) period of at least 5 years since the age of 11.
 : prior to 2000 Germany's nationality law was based entirely on jus sanguinis, but now children born in Germany on or after 1 January 2000 to non-German parents acquire German citizenship at birth if at least one parent has a permanent residence permit (and had this status for at least three years) and resided in Germany for at least eight years prior to the child's birth. However, jus soli citizens will lose their German citizenship upon turning 23 unless they: (i) reside in Germany for at least 8 years during their first 21 years of life; or (ii) attend school in Germany for at least 6 years; or (iii) graduate from high school/college in Germany; or (iv) complete professional/vocational training in Germany.
  Greece: Apart from regulations in past and historic nationality laws of Greece granting nationality jus soli, Greek Nationality Code of 2004 states that "A person born in Greek territory acquires by birth the Greek nationality if not acquiring alien nationality or is of unknown nationality". Additionally, as from 2015's amendment of 2004 Cod (Law 4332 of 2015, G.G. A/76/9 July 2015), a child born in Greece by foreign parents, shall acquire the right of Greek nationality with a combination of preliminary school attendance and parents' legal residence in Greece (5 years, 10 if the child is born prior to 5 years of legal residence). One year after the implementation of the law (as from July 2016), 6,029 children had been granted Greek nationality, out of 27,720 submitted applications.
 : On 1 January 2005, the law was amended to require that at least one of the parents be an Irish citizen; a British citizen; a resident with a permanent right to reside in Ireland or in Northern Ireland; or a legal resident residing three of the last four years in the country (excluding students and asylum seekers) (see Irish nationality law). The amendment was prompted by the case of Man Chen, a Chinese woman living in mainland United Kingdom who travelled to Belfast (Northern Ireland, part of the UK) to give birth in order to benefit from the previous rule whereby anyone born on any part of the island of Ireland was automatically granted Irish citizenship. The Chinese parents used their daughter's Irish (and thereby European Union) citizenship to obtain permanent residence in the UK as parents of a dependent EU citizen. Ireland was the last country in Europe to abolish unrestricted jus soli. (see Irish nationality law).
 : The law that regulates this right is n. 91 of 05.02.1992. Article 4 paragraph 2 grants this possibility to a person born in Italy, who has legally resided there without interruption until reaching the age of majority, and becomes a citizen if they declare that they wish to acquire Italian citizenship within one year from the aforementioned date. They can make use of this right by submitting a simple declaration of will to the Civil Status Office of their municipality of residence. It is important to know that the Municipality of belonging is required, according to article 33 of Law 98/2013, to inform foreign citizens, during the 6 months preceding the age of 18, of the possibility of applying for Italian citizenship by the age of nineteen. In the absence of such communication, the request can be made even after the age of 19. In the event that, despite having been born in Italy, one has not had continuous residence from birth, but has resided in Italy for at least three years, at the age of 18, the application can be presented at the Prefecture with all the necessary documentation. Furthermore, in application of art. 1 of the same law and which aims to prevent statelessness, in Italy the ius soli is applied in other cases: - by birth in Italy of unknown or stateless parents; - by birth on Italian territory of foreign parents unable to transmit their citizenship to the subject according to the law of the country of origin; - the child of unknown persons found in the territory of the Republic is considered a citizen by birth, if the possession of another citizenship is not proven.
 : A person born in Luxembourg is automatically a Luxembourg citizen if at least one of their parents was also born in Luxembourg. Additionally, a person born in Luxembourg to foreign, non-Luxembourg-born parents can become a Luxembourg citizen from the age of 12 if they have resided uninterrupted in Luxembourg for at least 5 years immediately prior to submitting the application, and if at least one of their parents lived in Luxembourg uninterrupted for at least 12 months immediately preceding their birth. Furthermore, a person born in Luxembourg to foreign, non-Luxembourg-born parents gains Luxembourg citizenship automatically upon reaching the age of 18, provided that they have lived uninterrupted in Luxembourg for the preceding 5 years and at least one of their parents lived uninterrupted in Luxembourg for at least 12 months immediately preceding their birth.
 : A person born in Malta on or after 1 August 1989 is automatically a Maltese citizen if at least one of their parents is Maltese or was born in Malta. Anyone born in Malta before 1 August 1989, regardless of their parents' circumstances, is automatically a Maltese citizen, as the country conferred unconditional jus soli until this date (see Maltese nationality law).
 : A child born in Portuguese territory to parents who do not possess another nationality is a Portuguese citizen. Also, a person born to foreign parents who were not serving their respective states at the time of birth is a Portuguese citizen if the person declares that they want to be Portuguese and provided that one of the parents has resided in Portugal for at least one year at the time of birth.
 : A child born in Spain to foreign parents may acquire Spanish citizenship jus soli under certain conditions, for example, if either one of the parents was also born in Spain or if neither of the parents can transmit their nationality to the child (such as stateless parents).
 : A child born on the territory of Ukraine may acquire Ukrainian citizenship jus soli, if it does not acquire foreign nationality by jus sanguinis from parents, or if parents have been granted refugee or asylum status in Ukraine, or if the child is stateless or of unknown nationality (see Ukrainian citizenship law, articles 6 and 7).
 : Since 1 January 1983, at least one parent must be a British citizen or be legally "settled" in the country or upon the 10th birthday of the child regardless of their parent's citizenship status (see British nationality law).

Oceania 
 : Since 20 August 1986, a person born in Australia acquires Australian citizenship by birth only if at least one parent was an Australian citizen or permanent resident; or else after living the first ten years of their life in Australia, regardless of their parents' citizenship status (see Australian nationality law).
 : Since 1 January 2006, a person born in New Zealand acquires New Zealand citizenship by birth only if at least one parent was a New Zealand citizen or permanent resident (includes Australian citizens and Permanent Residents) (see New Zealand nationality law), or if to prevent being stateless.
 : As mentioned above, people born in American Samoa do not acquire U.S. citizenship at birth, unless one of their parents is a U.S. citizen.

Abolition 
  India: A person that was born in India from 26 January 1950 until 1 July 1987 is a citizen by birth, regardless of the parents' nationality. It began to be restricted in 1987. As of 2020, a person born in India is a citizen if at least one parent is a citizen, and the other parent is a citizen or a legal migrant. These measures were brought in largely in reaction to illegal migration from Bangladesh.

See also 

 Birth tourism
 Birthright citizenship in the United States
 History of citizenship
 Jus sanguinis
 Nationality law

Explanatory notes

References 

Birthplaces
Citizenship
Common law rules
Human migration
Legal rules with Latin names
Republicanism